Hanns Eisler (6 July 1898 – 6 September 1962) was an Austrian composer (his father was Austrian, and Eisler fought in a Hungarian regiment in World War I). He is best known for composing the national anthem of East Germany, for his long artistic association with Bertolt Brecht, and for the scores he wrote for films. The Hochschule für Musik Hanns Eisler Berlin is named after him.

Family background
Johannes Eisler was born in Leipzig in Saxony, the son of Rudolf Eisler, a professor of philosophy, and Marie Ida Fischer. His father was an atheist of Jewish origin and his mother was Lutheran. In 1901, the family moved to Vienna. His brother, Gerhart, was a Communist journalist, and his sister, Elfriede, was a leader of the Communist Party of Germany in the mid-1920s. After emigrating to America, she turned into an anti-Stalinist, writing books against her former political affiliation, and even testifying against her brothers before the House Un-American Activities Committee.

At age 14 Eisler joined a socialist youth group.

Early years and Bertolt Brecht

During the Great War, Hanns Eisler served as a front-line soldier in the Austro-Hungarian army and was wounded several times in combat. Returning to Vienna after Austria's defeat, he studied from 1919 to 1923 under Arnold Schoenberg. Eisler was the first of Schoenberg's disciples to compose in the twelve-tone or serial technique. He married Charlotte Demant in 1920; they separated in 1934. In 1925, he moved to Berlin—then a hothouse of experimentation in music, theater, film, art and politics. There he became an active supporter of the Communist Party of Germany and became involved with the November Group. In 1928, he taught at the Marxist Workers' School in Berlin and his son Georg Eisler, who would grow up to become an important painter, was born. His music became increasingly oriented towards political themes and, to Schoenberg's dismay, more "popular" in style with influences drawn from jazz and cabaret. At the same time, he drew close to Bertolt Brecht, whose own turn towards Marxism happened at about the same time. The collaboration between the two artists lasted for the rest of Brecht's life.

In 1929, Eisler composed the song cycle Zeitungsausschnitte, Op. 11. The work is dedicated to Margot Hinnenberg-Lefebre. Though not written in the twelve-tone technique, it was perhaps the forerunner of a musical art style later known as "News Items" (or perhaps better characterized as "news clippings") – musical compositions that parodied a newspaper's content and style, or that included lyrics lifted directly from newspapers, leaflets, magazines or other written media of the day. The cycle parodies a newspaper's layout and content, with the songs comprising it given titles similar to headlines. Its content reflects Eisler's socialist leanings, with lyrics memorializing the struggles of ordinary Germans subject to post–World War I hardships.

Eisler wrote music for several Brecht plays, including The Decision (Die Maßnahme) (1930), The Mother (1932) and Schweik in the Second World War (1957). They also collaborated on protest songs that celebrated, and contributed to, the political turmoil of Weimar Germany in the early 1930s. Their "Solidarity Song" became a popular militant anthem sung in street protests and public meetings throughout Europe, and their "Ballad of Paragraph 218" was the world's first song protesting laws against abortion. Brecht-Eisler songs of this period tended to look at life from "below"—from the perspective of prostitutes, hustlers, the unemployed and the working poor. In 1931–32 he collaborated with Brecht and director Slatan Dudow on the working-class film Kuhle Wampe.

Exile
After 1933, Eisler's music and Brecht's poetry were banned by the Nazi Party. Both artists went into exile. While Brecht settled in Svendborg, Denmark, Eisler traveled for a number of years, working in Prague, Vienna, Paris, London, Moscow, Spain, Mexico and Denmark. He made two visits to the US, with speaking tours from coast to coast.

In 1938, Eisler finally managed to emigrate to the United States with a permanent visa. In New York City, he taught composition at New School for Social Research and wrote experimental chamber and documentary music. In 1942, he moved to Los Angeles where he joined Brecht, who had arrived in California in 1941 after a long trip eastward from Denmark across the Soviet Union and the Pacific Ocean.

In the U.S., Eisler composed music for various documentary films and for eight Hollywood film scores, two of which – Hangmen Also Die! and None but the Lonely Heart – were nominated for Oscars in 1944 and 1945 respectively. Also working on Hangmen Also Die! was Bertolt Brecht, who wrote the story along with director Fritz Lang. From 1927 to the end of his life, Eisler wrote the music for 40 films, making film music the largest part of his compositions after vocal music for chorus and/or solo voices.

On 1 February 1940, he began work on the "Research Program on the Relation between Music and Films" funded by a grant from the Rockefeller Foundation, which he got with the help of film director Joseph Losey and The New School. This work resulted in the book Composing for the Films which was published in 1947, with Theodor W. Adorno as co-author.

In several chamber and choral compositions of this period, Eisler returned to the twelve-tone method he had abandoned in Berlin. His Fourteen Ways of Describing the Rain – composed for Arnold Schoenberg's 70th birthday celebration – is considered a masterpiece of the genre.

Eisler's works of the 1930s and 1940s included Deutsche Sinfonie (1935–57)—a choral symphony in eleven movements based on poems by Brecht and Ignazio Silone—and a cycle of art songs published as the Hollywood Songbook (1938–43). With lyrics by Brecht, Eduard Mörike, Friedrich Hölderlin and Goethe, it established Eisler's reputation as one of the 20th century's great composers of German lieder.

HUAC investigation
Eisler's promising career in the U.S. was interrupted by the Cold War. He was one of the first artists placed on the Hollywood blacklist by the film studio bosses. In two interrogations by the House Committee on Un-American Activities, the composer was accused of being "the Karl Marx of music" and the chief Soviet agent in Hollywood. Among his accusers was his sister Ruth Fischer, who also testified before the Committee that her other brother, Gerhart, was a Communist agent.

His supporters
Eisler's supporters—including his friend Charlie Chaplin and the composers Igor Stravinsky, Aaron Copland and Leonard Bernstein—organized benefit concerts to raise money for his defense fund, but he was deported early in 1948. Folksinger Woody Guthrie protested the composer's deportation in his lyrics for "Eisler on the Go"—recorded fifty years later by Billy Bragg and Wilco on the Mermaid Avenue album (1998). In the song, an introspective Guthrie asked himself what he would do if called to testify before the House Committee on Un-American Activities: "I don't know what I'll do / I don't know what I'll do / Eisler's on the come and go / and I don't know what I'll do."

On departing from the U.S.
On 26 March 1948, Eisler and his wife, Lou, departed from LaGuardia Airport and flew to Prague. Before he left, he read the following statement:

I leave this country not without bitterness and infuriation. I could well understand it when in 1933 the Hitler bandits put a price on my head and drove me out. They were the evil of the period; I was proud at being driven out. But I feel heartbroken over being driven out of this beautiful country in this ridiculous way.

In East Germany

Eisler returned to Austria, and later moved to East Berlin. In East Germany, he composed the national anthem of the German Democratic Republic, a cycle of cabaret-style songs to satirical poems by Kurt Tucholsky and incidental music for theater, films, television and party celebrations.

His most ambitious project of the period was the opera Johannes Faustus on the Faust theme. The libretto, written by Eisler himself, was published in the fall of 1952. It portrayed Faust as an indecisive man who betrayed the cause of the working class by not joining the German Peasants' War. In May 1953, Eisler's libretto was attacked by a major article in Neues Deutschland, the SED organ, which disapproved of the negative depiction of Faust as a renegade and accused the work of being "a slap in the face of German national feeling" and of having "formalistically deformed one of the greatest works of our German poet Goethe" (Ulbricht). Eisler's opera project was discussed in three of the bi-weekly meetings "Mittwochsgesellschaft" [Wednesday club] of a circle of intellectuals under the auspices of the Berlin Academy of Arts beginning on 13 May 1953. The last of these meetings took place on Wednesday, 10 June 1953.

A week later, the East German uprising of 1953 pushed those debates from the agenda. Eisler fell into a depressive mood, and did not write the music for the opera. In his last work, "Ernste Gesänge" (Serious Songs), written between spring 1961 and August 1962, Eisler attempted to work through his depression, taking up the 20th Congress of the Communist Party of the Soviet Union with its demise of the Stalin cult, as a sign of hope for a future enabling to "live without fear". Although he continued to work as a composer and to teach at the East Berlin conservatory, the gap between Eisler and the cultural functionaries of East Germany grew wider in the last decade of his life. During this period, he befriended musician Wolf Biermann and tried to promote him (but in 1976, Biermann would be stripped of his GDR citizenship while on concert tour in West Germany).

Eisler collaborated with Brecht until the latter's death in 1956. He never recovered completely from his friend's demise, and his remaining years were marred by depression and declining health. He died of a heart attack (his second) in East Berlin in September 1962, and is buried near Brecht in the Dorotheenstadt cemetery.

Compositions
 1918: Gesang des Abgeschiedenen ("Die Mausefalle") (after Christian Morgenstern); "Wenn es nur einmal so ganz still wäre" (after Rainer Maria Rilke)
 1919: Drei Lieder (Li-Tai-Po, Klabund); "Sehr leises Gehn im lauen Wind";
 1922: Allegro moderato and Waltzes; Allegretto and Andante for Piano
 1923: Piano Sonata No. 1, Op. 1
 1923: Divertimento; Four Piano Pieces
 1923: Divertimento for wind quintet, Op. 4
 1924: Piano Sonata No. 2, Op. 6
 1925: Eight Piano Pieces
 1926: Tagebuch des Hanns Eisler (Diary of Hanns Eisler); 11 Zeitungsausschnitte; Ten Lieder; Three Songs for Men's Chorus (after Heinrich Heine)
 1928: "Drum sag der SPD ade"; "Lied der roten Matrosen" ("Song of the Red Sailors", with Erich Weinert); Pantomime (with Béla Balázs); "Kumpellied"; "Red Sailors' Song"; "Couplet vom Zeitfreiwilligen"; "Newspaper's Son"; "Auch ein Schumacher (verschiedene Dichter)"; "Was möchst du nicht" (from Des Knaben Wunderhorn); "Wir sind das rote Sprachrohr"
 Between 1929 and 1931: "Solidaritätslied"
 1929: Tempo der Zeit (Tempo of Time) for chorus and small orchestra, Op. 16; Six Lieder (after Weinert, Weber, Jahnke and Vallentin); "Lied der Werktätigen" ("Song of the Working People"; with Stephan Hermlin)
 1930: Die Maßnahme (The Measures Taken, Lehrstück, text by Bertolt Brecht), Op. 20; Six Ballads (after Weber, Brecht, and Walter Mehring); Four Ballads (after B. Traven, Kurt Tucholsky, Wiesner-Gmeyner, and Arendt); Suite No. 1, Op. 23
 1931 incidental music for Die Mutter (The Mother) by Bertolt Brecht (after Maxim Gorky), for small theatre orchestra
 1931: "Lied der roten Flieger" (after Semyon Kirsanov); Four Songs (after Frank, Weinert) from the film Niemandsland; film music for Kuhle Wampe (texts by Brecht) with the famous "Ballad of the Pirates", "Song of Mariken", Four Ballads (with Bertolt Brecht); Suite No. 2, Op. 24 ("Niemandsland"); Three Songs after Erich Weinert; "Das Lied vom vierten Mann" ("The Song of the Fourth Man"); "Streiklied" ("Strike Song"); Suite No. 3, Op. 26 ("Kuhle Wampe")
 1932: "Ballad of the Women and the Soldiers" (with Brecht); Seven Piano Pieces; Kleine Sinfonie (Little Symphony); Suite No. 4, Music for the Russian film Pesn' o geroyakh (Song of Heroes) by Joris Ivens with "Song from the Urals" (after Sergei Tretyakov); reissued as instrumental piece Op. 30 ("Die Jugend hat das Wort")
 1934: "Einheitsfrontlied" ("United Front Song"); "Saarlied" ("Saar Song"), "Lied gegen den Krieg" ("Song Against War"), "Ballade von der Judenhure Marie Sanders" ("Ballad of the Jews' Whore Marie Sanders"), songs from Die Rundköpfe und die Spitzköpfe; "Sklave, wer wird dich befreien" ("Slave, who will liberate you"; with Brecht); "California Ballad"; Six Pieces; Prelude and Fugue on B–A–C–H (string trio); Spartakus 1919, Op. 43
 1935: Die Mutter (The Mother) rewritten as cantata for chorus, solo voices and two pianos for a New York stage production
 1935: Lenin Requiem for solo voices, chorus and orchestra
 1936: Cantata Gegen den Krieg
 1937: Seven cantatas based on texts taken from Ignazio Silone's novels Bread and Wine and Fontamara for solo voice, strings and woodwind instruments
 Die Römische Kantate, Op. 60;
 Kantate im Exil (Man lebt von einem Tag zu dem andern), Op. 62;
 Kantate "Nein" (Kantate im Exil No. 2);
 Kantate auf den Tod eines Genossen, Op. 64;
 Kriegskantate, Op. 65;
 Die den Mund auf hatten;
 Die Weißbrotkantate.
 "Friedenssong" ("Peace Song", after Petere); "Kammerkantaten" ("Chamber Cantatas"); Ulm 1592; "Bettellied "("Begging Song", with Brecht); "Lenin Requiem" (with Brecht)
 1938: Cantata on Herr Meyers' First Birthday; String Quartet; Fünf Orchesterstücke ; Theme and Variations "Der lange Marsch"
 1939: Nonet No. 1
 1940: Music for the documentary film White Flood (Frontier Films), reissued as Chamber Symphony (Kammersymphonie)
 1941: Music for the documentary film A Child went forth (directed by Joseph Losey), reissued as Suite for Septet No. 1, op. 92a
 1940/41: Film music for The Forgotten Village (directed by Herbert Kline and Alexander Hammid, written by John Steinbeck)
 1940/41: Nonet No. 2
 1941: Woodbury-Liederbüchlein (Woodbury Songbook, 20 children songs for female choir written in Woodbury, Connecticut); "14 Arten den Regen zu beschreiben" (14 ways to describe rain) (inspired by the Joris Ivens film Rain (1929), later dedicated to Arnold Schoenberg for his 70th birthday)
 1942: "Hollywood-Elegien" ("Hollywood Elegies"; with Brecht) in the Hollywooder Liederbuch (Hollywood Songbook)
 1943: Film music for Hangmen Also Die!; Piano Sonata No. 3
 1943: Songs for Schweik in the Second World War; "Deutsche Misere" (with Brecht)
 1943: Piano sonata no. 3
 1945: Film score for The Spanish Main, directed by Frank Borzage
 1946: "Glückliche Fahrt" ("Prosperous Voyage", after Goethe); Songs and ballad for Brecht's play Life of Galileo.
 1946: Film scores for A Scandal in Paris and Deadline at Dawn
 1947: Septet No. 2
 1947: Music for The Woman on the Beach, film directed by Jean Renoir
 1948: Incidental music for Johann Nestroy's play Höllenangst
 1948: "Lied über die Gerechtigkeit" ("Song of Justice", after W. Fischer)
 1949: Berliner-Suite; Rhapsody; "Lied über den Frieden" ("Song about Peace"); Auferstanden aus Ruinen (National Anthem of the DDR (text by Johannes R. Becher)); "Treffass"
 1950: , collection of songs to texts by Becher
 1950: "Mitte des Jahrhunderts" (after Becher); Four Lieder on Die Tage der Commune; Children's Songs (with Brecht)
 1952: "Das Lied vom Glück" ("The Song of Happiness"; after Brecht); "Das Vorbild" (after Goethe)
 1954 : Winterschlacht-Suite
 1955: Night and Fog, music for the film Herr Puntila and His Servant Matti; Puntila-Suite; "Im Blumengarten" ("In the flower garden"); "Die haltbare Graugans"; Three Lieder after Brecht; music for the 1955 film Bel Ami
 1956: Vier Szenen auf dem Lande (Katzgraben) ("Four Scenes from the Country", after Erwin Strittmatter); Children's Songs (after Brecht); "Fidelio" (after Beethoven)
 1957: Sturm-Suite für Orchester; Bilder aus der Kriegsfibel; "Die Teppichweber von Kujan-Bulak" ("The Carpetweavers of Kujan-Bulak", with Brecht); "Lied der Tankisten" (text by Weinert); "Regimenter gehn"; "Marsch der Zeit" ("March of Time", after Vladimir Mayakovsky); Three Lieder (after Mayakovsky and Peter Hacks); "Sputnik-Lied" ("Sputnik Song", text of Kuba (Kurt Barthel)); film music for Les Sorcières de Salem (The Crucible)
 1935–1958: Deutsche Sinfonie (after texts of Bertolt Brecht and Ignazio Silone)
 1958: "Am 1. Mai" ("To May Day", with Brecht)
 1959: 36 more songs on texts by Kurt Tucholsky for Gisela May and Ernst Busch;
 1962: "Ernste Gesänge" ("Serious Songs"), seven Lieder after Friedrich Hölderlin, Berthold Viertel, Giacomo Leopardi, Helmut Richter, and Stephan Hermlin

Writings
A Rebel in Music: selected writings. New York: International Publishers, 1978

References

Works cited

Further reading
 Alonso, Diego. (6 December 2019) "From the People to the People: The Reception of Hanns Eisler's Critical Theory of Music in Spain through the Writings of Otto Mayer-Serra", in: Musicologica Austriaca. Journal for Austrian Music Studies
 
 Boyd, Caleb (2013). "They Called Me An Alien": Hanns Eisler's American Years, 1935–1948. M.A. thesis. Arizona State University.
 Horn, Eva, "Bertolt Brecht and the Politics of Secrecy", p. 17

External links

 The International Hanns Eisler Society
 
 North American Hanns Eisler Forum 
 Orel Foundation Hanns Eisler – biography, bibliography, works and discography.
 Hanns Eisler Complete Edition (projected publication of all his scores and writings)
 
 Hanns Eisler Project
 Georg Eisler Gallery
 Hanns Eisler FBI File

1898 births
1962 deaths
20th-century classical composers
Austrian classical composers
German classical composers
German male classical composers
Twelve-tone and serial composers
German film score composers
Male film score composers
Second Viennese School
Austro-Hungarian military personnel of World War I
Musicians from Leipzig
German communists
Hollywood blacklist
People deported from the United States
Recipients of the National Prize of East Germany
People from the Kingdom of Saxony
Pupils of Arnold Schoenberg
20th-century German composers
National anthem writers
Political music artists
Austrian emigrants to East Germany
Academic staff of the Hochschule für Musik Hanns Eisler Berlin
20th-century German male musicians